Dordoy Bazaar (also spelled Dordoi Bazaar in English) is a large wholesale and retail market in Bishkek, Kyrgyzstan. It is one of Asia's greatest public marketplaces, comparable to Bangkok's Chatuchak Weekend Market or Tehran's Grand Bazaar. It has been described by a Western journalist as "a modern monument to the power of raw commerce".

Dordoy Bazaar is a major shopping and employment centre for the Bishkek metropolitan area and entire Chuy River Valley region. It is also one of the main entrepots through which consumer goods from China arrive at shops and markets in Kazakhstan, Russia, and Uzbekistan. According to some economists, this re-export (the other center for which, targeting Uzbekistan, is the Karasuu Bazar at Kara-Suu, Osh Region) is one of two largest economic activities of Kyrgyzstan.

Location and organization 

The Dordoy market stretches for more than a kilometre on the north-eastern outskirts of Bishkek, near the bypass highway that skirts the city in the north. Legally, it is an agglomeration of several independent markets adjacent to each other. Since there are no fences, the borders between the markets are not particularly noticeable. According to a 2007 city atlas, the component markets are:
 Ak-Suu
 Vostok ('East')
 Sever ('North')
 Muras-Sport
 Alkanov i K ('Alkanov & Co.')
 Evropa ('Europe')
 Kerben
 Kitay ('China')
 Zhonghai (which formally is considered a separate market from Dordoy)

Most of the market is built of double-stacked shipping containers. Typically, the lower container is a shop, while the upper one provides storage. According to a 2005 newspaper report, there were 6,000 to 7,000 containers in the bazaar. Approximately 20,000 people worked there (as vendors, security, or service personnel).

The containers, organized in dozens of rows, form streets and plazas of a sort. Smaller buildings between the blocks of containers house restaurants, administrative offices, toilets, hotels, and other ancillary structures.

History 

The market is said to date from 1992, its 15th anniversary being celebrated in 2007.
In the view of journalists from the neighbouring Uzbekistan, one of the causes for the rise of Bishkek's Dordoy Bazaar was the decline of Uzbekistan's major wholesale markets. After the Uzbek government transferred Tashkent's huge Hippodrome Market to the jurisdiction of the Ministry of the Interior in 1998, increased police harassment of the trader resulted in Hippodrome losing its dominant position in the region. After its reconstruction in 2002–2003, Hippodrome, which once had 8,600 trading outlets and 18,000 traders, was succeeded by the much smaller Chilanzar goods market with 2,540 outlets. A similar story took place in Jizzakh, where in 2006 authorities closed the Dunyo Bozori (Uzbek for "World Market") marketplace (which had been established by Chinese traders) to replace it with the Abu Sahiy Nur shopping centre. As Uzbekistan's markets declined, purchasing by Uzbek buyers has shifted to Kyrgyzstan's Bishkek or Kara-Suu.

Ownership and management 
Most of the marketplace (Dordoy proper, i.e. everything but Zhonghai) is run by OsOO "Dordoy Bazari", a member of the 
"group of companies" called Dordoi Association. The Zhonghai section is run by Dordoi Asia, another member of the same group.

Besides the Dordoy markets, Dordoi Association also owns the smaller Alamedi Market, closer to central Bishkek (via OsOO "Alamudun Bazari"), Dordoi Plaza shopping mall in downtown Bishkek, a number of manufacturing and service companies in Bishkek and elsewhere, a beach resort at Koshkol' on Lake Issyk Kul, and the soccer team Dordoi-Dynamo Naryn.

The traders 

Different sections of the markets specialize in various types of consumer goods, including clothing, shoes, furniture, electric and electronic equipment, toys, automotive supplies, construction materials, etc. While some kinds of groceries (e.g. factory-packaged canned goods or sweets) are sold at Dordoy, it is not a produce market. Occasional produce vendors are present merely to feed the vendors and customers.

Most of the goods sold at Dordoy arrive from China, with the second largest source (perhaps 30% of all imports) being Turkey. One can also find clothing from Thailand and Europe, music CDs from Russia, and goods from many other countries in Eurasia, as well as a selection of local products.

Although many of the people working and shopping at the Bazaar speak Kyrgyz, Russian is the main language used in trade.

Transportation 

There is no rail access to the market: all goods enter and depart the bazaar by truck or car.

Two large plazas near the northern and southern ends of the market are connected by frequent minibus service with central Bishkek. From the northern plaza, minibuses also run to various points throughout Chüy Region, including Sokuluk, Kant, Tokmok, and Korday border crossing (on the Kazakhstan border). For the convenience of the "shuttle traders", charter buses run from Dordoy to several major cities in Kazakhstan and in Russia's Urals and Western Siberia.

See also 
 Bazaar
 Market (place)
 Retail
 Shipping container architecture
 Souq

References

External links 

 Isaac Rotschild, "Tour de Dordoi " - Photos and essay on Dordoi Bazaar. The Spektator Magazine, No. 3, Dec 2008/Jan 2009), pp. 20–22.
  Dordoy (Dordoi) map 
 A Steel Caravanserai Booms on the Modern Silk Road

Bazaars
Retail markets in Bishkek
Shopping malls established in 1992